Uncial 066 (in the Gregory-Aland numbering), α 1000 (Soden), is a Greek uncial manuscript of the New Testament. Palaeographically it has been assigned to the 6th-century.

Description 
The codex contains a small part of the Acts 28:8-17, on one parchment leaf (25 cm by 20 cm). The text is written in two columns per page, 25 lines per page. It is a palimpsest. The upper text has a Georgian calendar. 

The Greek text of this codex is a representative of the Western text-type, but it has some the Caesarean readings. Kurt Aland placed it in Category III. 

Currently the manuscript is dated by the INTF to the 6th century.

Constantin von Tischendorf published its text.

It is currently housed at the Russian National Library (Suppl. Gr. 6, II, fol 4) in Saint Petersburg.

See also 
 List of New Testament uncials
 Textual criticism

References

Further reading 

 Constantin von Tischendorf, Monumenta Sacra Inedita. Nova collectio. Vol. I. Fragmenta Sacra Palimpsesta (Leipzig: 1845), pp. 43-44. 
 Kurt Treu, "Die Griechischen Handschriften des Neuen Testaments in der USSR; eine systematische Auswertung des Texthandschriften in Leningrad, Moskau, Kiev, Odessa, Tbilisi und Erevan", T & U 91 (Berlin: 1966), pp. 292-293.

External links 
 Images at the CSNTM

Palimpsests
Greek New Testament uncials
6th-century biblical manuscripts
National Library of Russia collection